28 Nëntori High School is a public high school in Shkodra, Albania. It is the largest school in the city.

See also 
 Jordan Misja High School

References

External links 
 https://web.archive.org/web/20110707103758/http://albaniafoto.albumi.com/displayimage.php?album=14&pos=6 – a picture of the school building

Secondary schools in Albania
Buildings and structures in Shkodër
Schools in Shkodër